The 2011 FIA WTCC Race of Spain was the ninth round of the 2011 World Touring Car Championship season and the seventh running of the FIA WTCC Race of Spain. It was held on 4 September 2011 at the Circuit Ricardo Tormo in Valencia, Spain.

Both races were won by Yvan Muller of Chevrolet RML who took the championship lead from teammate Robert Huff.

Background
Chevrolet driver Robert Huff was the championship leader coming into the round, six points ahead of Yvan Muller. Norbert Michelisz was leading the Yokohama Independents' Trophy.

Russian driver David Sigachev joined Engstler Motorsport for the event, running under the DeTeam KK Motorsport banner which had been in the championship at the start of the season.

Report

Free practice
Muller set the pace in the first free practice session with Alain Menu second and Huff third. Robert Dahlgren, Franz Engstler and Gabriele Tarquini were all caught out by the gravel trap at turn one, however Engstler went on to be the quickest independent driver by finishing eighth. bamboo-engineering's Darryl O'Young missed the session due to a fuel pump problem. Stefano D'Aste was fined €1,500 for ignoring yellow flags.

Muller was quickest again in the second practice session. The red flags came out early on when Proteam Racing's Fabio Fabiani crashed into the barriers at the first corner, the session was stopped for 20 minutes while repairs were made. Fabiani's teammate Mehdi Bennani had earlier beached his BMW 320 TC in the gravel at turn fourteen on his first flying lap, he tried to return to the track later on but was not allowed by the race officials as he had received outside assistance.

Qualifying
After leading both practice sessions, Muller set his third consecutive pole position in qualifying. He lined up for race one alongside title rival Huff. Tarquini topped the first part of qualifying with Menu second, Engstler was tenth in and would take the reversed grid pole position for race two for the second round in a row. Local driver Pepe Oriola looked set to make it through into the second session but dropped to eleventh at the last minute thanks to a quick lap from Michel Nykjær. Dahlgren was 17th having had little track time due to various problems,

The final part of qualifying was led by Muller throughout, Tarquini had initially been second until a late lap from Huff locked out the front row for Chevrolet. Tiago Monteiro would start on the second row was the fastest BMW driver in fifth, Menu was the last of the factory Chevrolet trio in sixth. Michelisz was the fastest independent driver, the Zengő-Dension Team driver having jumped up the timesheet at the expense of Javier Villa in the final moments of the session. Engstler and Nykjær completed the top ten.

Warm-Up
Having so far had a disappointing weekend, Polestar Racing driver Dahlgren topped the times in Sunday morning's warm–up session. Aleksei Dudukalo was having set up issues on his Lukoil-SUNRED SEAT, locking up frequently before depositing his car in the gravel at the first corner on his third lap.

Race One
Muller started on pole but he lost his lead almost immediately as Tarquini made a good getaway from third to pass the leading Chevrolet pair. Further round the lap, Monteiro tapped Menu then bumped into Huff who had been challenging for second place. Tarquini led until lap four when Muller made a successful pass for the lead at the second corner. Tarquini was succumbing to engine problems and he was passed by Menu before retiring with a misfire. Monteiro was running third before dropping down the order, Coronel took the final podium spot. At the chequered flag, Muller led a Chevrolet 1–2 to take the championship lead with Coronel third and Kristian Poulsen fourth taking the independent victory. Huff ended up fifth ahead of Villa, Michelisz and Monteiro. Dahlgren recovered from his disappointing grid spot to finish ninth and Stefano D'Aste was the last points scorer in tenth.

Race Two
Engstler started on pole position but made a slow start and Coronel took the lead, followed by Villa and Michelisz. The BMW trio led the race until four laps from the end when Villa made an attempt to take the lead, the Proteam driver made a move at turn two but Coronel defended and went up over the side of Villa's car. Villa ended up in the gravel, Coronel dropped down the order and Michelisz was unaffected by Muller passed the Zengő driver to take the lead. Michelisz was close behind until Huff made a last lap pass and Michelisz spun on the exit of the final corner. Muller won the second race of the day with Huff second and Menu third, Tarquini was fourth ahead of Poulsen who scored his second independent victory of the day.

Results

Qualifying

Bold denotes Pole position for second race.

Race 1

Bold denotes Fastest lap.

Race 2

Bold denotes Fastest lap.

Standings after the event

Drivers' Championship standings

Yokohama Independents' Trophy standings

Manufacturers' Championship standings

 Note: Only the top five positions are included for both sets of drivers' standings.

References

External links
World Touring Car Championship official website

Spain
FIA WTCC Race of Spain